LDMOS (laterally-diffused metal-oxide semiconductor) is a planar double-diffused MOSFET (metal–oxide–semiconductor field-effect transistor) used in amplifiers, including microwave power amplifiers, RF power amplifiers and audio power amplifiers. These transistors are often fabricated on p/p+ silicon epitaxial layers. The fabrication of LDMOS devices mostly involves various ion-implantation and subsequent annealing cycles. As an example, the drift region of this power MOSFET is fabricated using up to three ion implantation sequences in order to achieve the appropriate doping profile needed to withstand high electric fields.

The silicon-based RF LDMOS (radio-frequency LDMOS) is the most widely used RF power amplifier in mobile networks, enabling the majority of the world's cellular voice and data traffic. LDMOS devices are widely used in RF power amplifiers for base-stations as the requirement is for high output power with a corresponding drain to source breakdown voltage usually above 60 volts. Compared to other devices such as GaAs FETs they show a lower maximum power gain frequency.

Manufacturers of LDMOS devices and foundries offering LDMOS technologies include TSMC, LFoundry, Tower Semiconductor, SAMSUNG, GLOBALFOUNDRIES, Vanguard International Semiconductor Corporation, STMicroelectronics, Infineon Technologies, RFMD, NXP Semiconductors (including former Freescale Semiconductor), SMIC, MK Semiconductors, Polyfet and Ampleon.

Photo Gallery

Applications

Common applications of LDMOS technology include the following.

Amplifiers — RF power amplifiers, audio power amplifiers, class AB
Audio technology — loudspeakers, high-fidelity (hi-fi) equipment, public announcement (PA) systems
Mobile devices — mobile phones
Mobile networks — base stations and RF amplifiers
Pulse applications
Radio-frequency (RF) technology — RF engineering (RF engineering), RF power amplifiers
Wireless technology — wireless networks and digital networks

RF LDMOS

Common applications of RF LDMOS technology include the following.

See also 
 FET amplifier
 Power semiconductor device
 RF CMOS

References

External links 
 Microwave Encyclopedia on LDMOS
 BCD process including customizable LDMOS

Electronic design
Transistor types
MOSFETs